Bravo! Brubeck! is a 1967 live album by Dave Brubeck and his quartet, recorded during their tour of Mexico. The quartet were augmented by Chamin Correa on guitar, and the bongo and conga player Salvatore Agueros. It was released in 1967.

A second live album recorded on their tour, Buried Treasures, was released in 1998.

The album peaked at 9 on the Billboard Top Jazz Albums chart.

Reception

The album was reviewed by Scott Yanow at Allmusic who wrote that "One of the better Dave Brubeck LPs from the later period of the Quartet with altoist Paul Desmond, this set is unusual in that it only contains one Brubeck original. ...The results are melodic but swinging treatments of a variety of famous themes".

Track listing
 Introduction – 1:18
 "Cielito Lindo" (Traditional) – 5:01
 "La Paloma Azul (The Blue Dove)" (Traditional) – 6:16
 "Sobre las Olas (Over the Waves)" (Juventino Rosas) – 3:17
 "Besame Mucho" (Sunny Skylar, Consuelo Velázquez) – 5:53
 "Nostalgia de Mexico" (Dave Brubeck) – 4:03
 "Poinciana" (Buddy Bernier, Nat Simon) – 6:43
 "Alla en el Rancho Grande" (Emilio de Uranga) – 3:07
 "Frenesí" (Alberto Dominguez, Leonard Whitcup) – 5:19
 "Estrellita (Little Star)" (Manuel Ponce) – 4:50
 "La Bamba" (Traditional) – 4:50

Personnel
Performance
Dave Brubeck - piano, arranger, liner notes
Paul Desmond - alto saxophone
Chamin Correa - guitar
Gene Wright - double bass
Salvatore Agueros - bongo, conga
Joe Morello - drums
Teo Macero - producer
Production
Steven Berkowitz, Patti Matheny - a&r
Howard Fitzson — art direction
Randall Martin — design, reissue design
Seth Rothstein — director
Nicholas Bennett — packaging manager
Don Hunstein, Hank Parker — photography
Didier C. Deutsch, Russell Gloyd — reissue producer
Teo Macero — original recording producer
John Jackson — production assistant
Howard Fritzson — reissue art
Darcy Proper — remastering, remixing

References

1967 live albums
Albums produced by Teo Macero
Columbia Records live albums
Dave Brubeck live albums
Live instrumental albums